William II Berthout of Mechelen (died near De Meern, 4 February 1301) was bishop of Utrecht from 1296 to 1301, succeeding Jan II van Sierck.  He was a leader of the Berthout family, which ruled over the Heerlijkheid of Mechelen.

William was appointed without intervention from the chapters by pope Boniface VIII because of his anti-French and pro-English attitude.  He tried in vain to get back his lost lordships of Amstelland and Woerden until the death of count Floris V of Holland.  When he returned from a trip to Rome he found so much opposition to him in the Sticht that he sought refuge in Amersfoort.  In 1300 Boniface VIII suspended him as bishop since he had not paid back debts owed to the papal treasury, but when he paid these debts the suspension was lifted and he remained bishop until his death in battle against a coalition of the Dutch and his own rebellious subjects.  His intended successor as bishop, Adolf II of Waldeck, was passed over in favour of Guy of Avesnes.

Year of birth missing
1301 deaths
Prince-Bishops of Utrecht
13th-century Roman Catholic bishops in the Holy Roman Empire
14th-century Roman Catholic bishops in the Holy Roman Empire